Bethan Laura Wood (born in Shropshire, 1983) she is an internationally-recognised English designer of  jewellery, furniture, decorative objects, lighting and installations. She has designed for such media as glass, laminates and ceramics. Work produced by her studio, WOOD London, is characterised by colour, geometry and visual metaphor, pattern and marquetry. She has been described as "[re-contextualizing] ... elements from everyday objects, often focusing on the pattern and coloration of objects as indicators of their origins, production, and past usage."

Biography 
Wood was diagnosed with dyslexia at sixth-form college. She studied 3D design at  Brighton University, then studied at the Royal College of Art in 2007, tutored by Dutch designer Jurgen Bey and the Italian Martino Gamper. She founded her studio, "WOOD London", in 2009 while still a student. She was a designer in residence at the Design Museum, London. Wood has been commissioned by a variety of international companies to create works and installations, including Abet Laminati, Moroso, Valextra, Perrier Jouët, Bitossi Ceramiche, Tory Burch, cc-tapis, Tolix , Rosenthal and Hermés. Her work has been exhibited in institutions such as V&A Museum of Childhood, Swiss Institute Contemporary Art New York, Daelim Museum and  Museum of Contemporary Art, Tokyo. Wood was named in the Wallpaper* Power 200, which ranks her "among the world’s pre-eminent design talent".

Awards

Accolades 
 2019 - Judge for 2019 Dezeen Awards.
 2013 - Abet Museum – Play time table purchased for permanent collection.
 2012 - MUDAC – Totem no.5 purchased for permanent collection.
 2012 - One of 850 alumni invited to Diamond jubilee Royal academy of Arts Gala in attendants of the Queen

Select exhibitions 
 8 March to 28 April 2018: Aram Gallery - Designers select designers.
 22–25 September 2016: Designjunction - Dyslexic Design.
 20 September: The British Land Celebration of Design awards exhibition in Broadgate, London.
 2011: Nilufar gallery during Salone del Mobile with pieces such as Totem, a lighting collection made from Pyrex in collaboration with master glass-blower Pietro Viero.
 September 2013: Aram Gallery - Solo show.

Collections 
Wood's works can be found in the permanent collections of the Victoria and Albert Museum in London, the Wellcome Collection in London and the Abet Laminate Museum in Italy.

References

External links 
 
 Bethan Laura Wood on laminate (interview by Grant Gibson)

1983 births
Living people
21st-century English women artists
Alumni of the Royal College of Art
Alumni of the University of Brighton
English designers
Artists from Shropshire